Karkams is a town in Namakwa District Municipality in the Northern Cape province of South Africa.

References

Populated places in the Kamiesberg Local Municipality